Stenoptilia islandicus, also known as the mountain plume, is a moth of the family Pterophoridae found in Europe. It was first described by Otto Staudinger in 1857.

Description
The wingspan is 17–19 mm. Adults are on wing in June and July.

The larvae feed on the flowers and seeds of saxifrages (Saxifraga species), including purple saxifrage (Saxifraga oppositifolia) and yellow saxifrage (Saxifraga aizoides).

Distribution
It is known from  Finland, Iceland, Norway, Scotland (from one mountain), Sweden and northern Russia.

References

External links
 Swedish Moths

islandicus
Moths described in 1857
Moths of Iceland
Plume moths of Europe
Taxa named by Otto Staudinger